Amable-Gabrielle de Villars (1706-1771), was a French court official.  She served as the dame d'atour to queen Marie Leszczyńska from 1742 to 1768, and to queen Marie Antoinette from 1770 to 1771.

Life
She was the daughter of Adrien Maurice de Noailles, duc de Noailles and Françoise Charlotte d'Aubigné, duchesse de Noailles and married, in 1721, to Don Honoré Armand de Villars, duc de Villars. She had no children with her husband, who was homosexual, but did have one daughter with Jean Philippe d'Orléans, himself the son of Philippe II, duc d'Orléans and Marie Louise Madeleine Victoire Bel de La Boissière d'Argenton. Named Amable Angélique de Villars (1723-1771), she was accepted by her husband and raised as his daughter.

She was appointed dame du palais to the queen in 1727.  In 1742, the queen managed to convince the chief minister to Louis XV, André-Hercule de Fleury, to have de Villars promoted to dame d'atour, after Françoise de Mazarin's death, in order to avoid the office being filled by Marie Anne de Mailly-Nesle, duchesse de Châteauroux. However, Mailly-Nesle did secure de Villars' former office of dame du palais.

In 1768, de Villars and the rest of the queen's household were allowed to retain their offices after her death and resumed them in the household of Marie Antoinette upon her arrival in France in 1770. By then, however, she was too old to manage her office and, during her tenure, the dauphine's household was drained of assets.

In 1923, a book entitled Le roman de la "Sainte Duchesse" : lettres inédites de la duchesse de Villars au comte d'Argenson (1738-1741) about her was published.

References

1706 births
1771 deaths
French ladies-in-waiting
Court of Louis XV
Household of Marie Leszczyńska
Household of Marie Antoinette